M. J. Shriram is a Born: (August 22, 1969) Tamil singer and actor who has worked in Tamil films. He is best known for his songs in Pachchak Kuthira (2006) and his role in Sivakasi (2005).

Career 
Shiram began singing when he was five-years-old. His talent enabled him to share the stage with Kamal Haasan at a concert in Singapore in 1993. He played a small role in Sollamale (1998) before playing Vijay's friend in the film, Sivakasi (2005), which is considered his acting debut. He made his singing debut in Parthiban's Pachchak Kuthira (2006).

Filmography

Actor
Films

Television

Singer

References

External links 
 

Living people
Indian male playback singers
Tamil playback singers
21st-century Indian singers
Male actors in Tamil cinema
Tamil comedians
21st-century Indian male singers
1964 births